National Day, officially the National Day of the People's Republic of China, is a public holiday in China celebrated annually on 1 October as the national day of the People's Republic of China, commemorating the formal proclamation of the establishment of the People's Republic of China on 1 October 1949. The Chinese Communist Party victory in the Chinese Civil War resulted in the Kuomintang retreat to Taiwan and the Chinese Communist Revolution whereby the People's Republic of China "replaced" the Republic of China. 

Although it is observed on 1 October, another six days are added to the official holiday, normally in lieu of the two weekend breaks around 1 October, making it a de facto public holiday comprising seven consecutive days also known as Golden Week with specifics regulated by the State Council. Festivities and concerts are usually held nationwide on this day, with a grand military parade and mass pageant event held on select years.  The parade held on 1 October 2019 marked the 70th anniversary of the People's Republic of China.

History 

The Chinese Communist Party (CCP) defeated the incumbent Kuomintang (KMT) nationalist government of the Republic of China in the Chinese Civil War that took place from 1927 to 1950 except for a brief alliance against Japan in the Second Sino-Japanese War. In its aftermath, the nationalist government withdrew to the island of Taiwan, previously a prefecture of the Qing Empire that was ceded to Japan under its colonial rule from 1895 to 1945.

The People's Republic of China was founded on 1 October 1949, with a ceremony celebrating the forming of the Central People's Government taking place in Tiananmen Square in its new national capital of Peking (previously Peiping) on the same day that year. The first public parade of the new People's Liberation Army took place there, following the address by the country's first Chairman Mao Zedong officially declaring the formal establishment of the Republic. The Central People's Government passed the Resolution on the National Day of the People's Republic of China on 3 December 1949, and declared that 1 October is the National Day.

National celebrations 
National Day marks the start of a Golden Week, a weeklong public holiday.

The day is celebrated throughout mainland China, Hong Kong, and Macau with a variety of government-organized festivities, including fireworks and concerts, as well as sports events and cultural events. Public places, such as Tiananmen Square in Beijing, are decorated in a festive theme. Portraits of revered leaders, such as Mao Zedong, are publicly displayed. The holiday is also celebrated by many overseas Chinese.

Wreath-laying ceremony at the Monument to the People's Heroes 
From 2004 to 2013, a national wreath-laying ceremony was held on National Day in Tiananmen Square following the flag raising ceremony on years with no parades. The ceremony was centered on the Monument to the People's Heroes, built in 1958 in remembrance of the millions of Chinese who perished during the long years of national struggle. Beginning in 2014, they have been held on a new holiday, Martyrs' Day, set on the eve of National Day, 30 September, and is presided by party and state leaders.

National flag-raising ceremony 
In some years, a flag-raising ceremony has been held at Tiananmen Square in the morning if no parade is scheduled. For many years, the 6 a.m. National Day flag-raising ceremony is the more important act on years without any anniversary parades. Held at the Tiananmen Square, since 2017 the Beijing Garrison Honor Guard Battalion's Color Guard Company is present for the ceremony with the National Marching Band of the PLA. Until 2016 the Beijing People's Armed Police units provided men for the ceremonial color guard. The ceremony is open to the general public and tourists and is widely televised and streamed online for viewers at home and aboard. At the end of the ceremony, doves are released.

National civil-military parade 

The special civil-military parade of the People's Liberation Army, People's Armed Police and the Militia together with representatives of the people of all walks of life including the Young Pioneers of China is held on special years in the morning of National Day itself. It has since 1984 been televised on China Central Television since 1984 (and broadcast around the world from that year as well via satellite and cable television), is a key highlight of the national celebrations in Beijing. The parade was annual from 1950-59 and terminated until 1984. There was a parade planned for 1989 but was cancelled following the June 4th crackdown. Parades were held again in 1999 and 2009.

The parade is overseen by the president of the People's Republic of China as well as other top leadership.

Gallery

See also
National Day
National Day of the Republic of China
History of the People's Republic of China
60th anniversary of the People's Republic of China
70th anniversary of the People's Republic of China

Notes

References

External links 

US-China Institute: 60 years of celebrating the creation of the people's republic
images of the 2009 celebration
Parts 1 2 3 and 4 of a documentary on the history of the Chinese National Day Parade
The National Day Parade Official Website (2009 version)

Public holidays in China
October observances
Autumn events in China
China, Peoples Republic